Lauren Pearce (born 12 January 1993) is an Australian rules footballer playing for the Melbourne Football Club in the AFL Women's competition. She was drafted by Melbourne with their fourth selection and twenty-fifth overall in the 2016 AFL Women's draft. She played every match in her debut season to finish with seven games.

Melbourne signed Pearce for the 2018 season during the trade period in May 2017.

References

External links 

1993 births
Living people
Melbourne Football Club (AFLW) players
Australian rules footballers from Victoria (Australia)
Darebin Falcons players